Blender.io is a cryptocurrency mixer that was established in 2017. In 2022, it was sanctioned by the Office of Foreign Assets Control of the U.S. Department of the Treasury for allegedly aiding the Lazarus Group, a hacking group associated with the government of North Korea. The Treasury Department stated that this was the first sanction that they had imposed on a cryptocurrency mixer.

References

See also 

 Tornado Cash
 ChipMixer

Cryptocurrency tumblers

2017 establishments